The 1945 International cricket season was from April 1945 to August 1945. There were no any international tournaments held due to Second World War.

Season overview

May

Australia Services in England

September

New Zealand Services in England

See also
 Cricket in World War II

References

1945 in cricket